Chuang Chia-jung and Junri Namigata were the defending champions, but Chuang chose not to participate. Namigata partnered Erika Sema, but lost in the first round to Miyu Kato and Kotomi Takahata.

Seeds

Draw

References 
 Draw

Jiangxi International Women's Tennis Open - Doubles
2015